Rudolph of Burgundy may refer to:

Rudolph, Duke of Burgundy (French, Raoul; also referred to as Ralph), Duke of Burgundy from 921 and King of West Francia from 923 to 936
Rudolph I, King of Burgundy, elected in 888 after the death of Charles the Fat. He died in 912
Rudolph II, King of Burgundy, son of Rudolph I, and ruled (Upper) Burgundy from 912 to 937; also king of Provence and Italy
Rudolph III, King of Burgundy, grandson of Rudolph II, ruled 993 - 1032